Syed Yasir Shah, better known as Yasir Shah, is a Pakistani actor, producer, screenwriter and model who started his acting career in India.

After doing modelling gigs in Pakistan, he was offered a role  by Ekta Kapoor of Balaji Telefilms, the protagonist Azaan Khan in the serial Khwaish, aired on Sony TV, a drama based on an Indian Muslim family in Dubai, which has been a major success and thus marked his debut in India's television industry. In one of his popular roles in Indian dramas he played the role of Munjaaal in the Sahara One TV drama Shorr  as serial protagonist. Since 2014 he has exclusively been active in Pakistan's entertainment industry.

Yasir Shah made his film debut with the 2016 Pakistani movie Blind Love.

In 2019, he turned producer as well as screenwriter with the Aaj Entertainment drama Rangdari.

Filmography

Television  series

Web series

Telefilm

Film

Awards and nominations

References

External links
 
 
 

1987 births
Pakistani male television actors
21st-century Pakistani male actors
Pakistani male models
Pakistani expatriates in the United Arab Emirates
Living people
Male actors in Urdu cinema